The London Canadians were an English amateur ice hockey team. They played during the early part of the 20th century. Formed primarily of Canadian expats, they were the first English champions, after winning the first ice hockey league to be played in Europe.

References

Defunct ice hockey teams in the United Kingdom
Ice hockey teams in London
Ice hockey clubs established in 1902
Sport in Hammersmith and Fulham